With Open Arms (Swedish: Stora famnen) is a 1940 Swedish comedy film directed by Gustaf Edgren and starring Sigurd Wallén, Signe Hasso and Olof Molander . The film's sets were designed by the art director Arne Åkermark.

Cast
 Sigurd Wallén as 	K. A. Koger
 Signe Hasso as Eva Richert
 Olof Molander as 	Henning Koger
 Erik 'Bullen' Berglund as Magnus Koger 
 Hjördis Petterson as Fanny Koger
 Britt-Lis Edgren as 	Ulla Koger
 Håkan Westergren as Jack Blom
 Allan Bohlin as Bertil Hansson
 Gerda Lundequist as Karolina Koger
 Marianne Löfgren as 	Märta Blom
 Siri Olson as 	Aina Blom
 Kotti Chave as 	Acke Blom
 John Norrman as Blom
 Eric Abrahamsson as Lundin
 Åke Ohberg as 	Ivar Bergström
 Bror Bügler as 	Sven Lindgren
 Viran Rydkvist as 	Amalia
 Wiktor Andersson as 	Gardener 
 Carl Deurell as 	Janitor
 Douglas Håge as 	Gentleman 
 Gunnar Sjöberg as 	Lawyer
 Nils Jacobsson as Assistant 
 Peter Lindgren as 	Student 
 Richard Lund as 	Doctor 
 Gaby Stenberg as Sales woman 
 Lill-Tollie Zellman as 	Daisy

References

Bibliography 
 Qvist, Per Olov & von Bagh, Peter. Guide to the Cinema of Sweden and Finland. Greenwood Publishing Group, 2000.

External links 
 

1940 films
Swedish comedy films
1940 comedy films
1940s Swedish-language films
Films directed by Gustaf Edgren
1940s Swedish films